Pascal Kober (born 3 July 1971) is a German military chaplain and politician of the Free Democratic Party (FDP) who has served as a member of the Bundestag from the state of Baden-Württemberg from 2009 to 2013 and again since 2017.

In addition to his parliamentary work, Kober has been serving as the Commissioner for the Victims of Domestic Terrorist Activities at the Federal Ministry of Justice in the government of Chancellor Olaf Scholz since 2022.

Early life and education 
Born in Sindelfingen, Baden-Württemberg, Kober grew up in Böblingen and studied Protestant theology at the universities of Tübingen, Kiel, and Neuendettelsau.

Career 
Kober is pastor of the Evangelical-Lutheran Church in Württemberg and was a member of the Bundestag from 2009 to 2013, representing the Reutlingen district. During that time, he served on the Committee on Labour and Social Affairs and the Committee on Human Rights and Humanitarian Aid. In addition to his committee assignments, he was part of the German-American Parliamentary Friendship Group and the German-Israeli Parliamentary Friendship Group.

Kober retired from politics with the federal elections in 2013 and worked as a military chaplain at the Bundeswehr's Stetten am kalten Markt and Pfullendorf sites from March 2014. In 2015 and 2016 he went on two foreign missions to Mali, as part of the European Union Training Mission in Mali (EUTM Mali) in Bamako and the United Nations Multidimensional Integrated Stabilization Mission in Mali (MINUSMA) in Gao.

Kober was elected deputy state chairman of the FDP in Baden-Württemberg on 5 January 2015 in Stuttgart, serving under the leadership of chairman Michael Theurer.

Kober became a member of the Bundestag again in the 2017 German federal election. Since January 2018, he has been a member of the Committee for Labour and Social Affairs. He is also his parliamentary group's spokesperson on social policy. In November 2018, Kober initiated a cross-party interest group on horses.
 
In the negotiations to form a so-called traffic light coalition of the Social Democratic Party (SPD), the Green Party and the FDP following the 2021 German elections, Kober was part of his party's delegation in the working group on social policy, co-chaired by Dagmar Schmidt, Sven Lehmann and Johannes Vogel.

Other activities
 Federal Academy for Security Policy (BAKS), Member of the Advisory Board (since 2022)
 Reservist Association of Deutsche Bundeswehr, Vice-President (since 2019)

References

External links 

  
 Bundestag biography 
 

 

 

1971 births
Living people
People from Sindelfingen
Members of the Bundestag for Baden-Württemberg
Members of the Bundestag 2021–2025
Members of the Bundestag 2017–2021
Members of the Bundestag 2009–2013
Members of the Bundestag for the Free Democratic Party (Germany)